Closest to the Heart is a 2018 Burmese romantic-drama television series. It aired on MRTV-4, from October 30 to November 26, 2018, on Mondays to Fridays at 19:00 for 20 episodes.

Cast
Kaung Myat San as Kaung Myat Thu
Nan Sandar Hla Htun as Moe Ma Kha
Thi Ha as Min Khant Naung
Swan Htet Nyi Nyi as Thura Zaw
May Akari Htoo as Cherry
Paing Oak Soe Aung as Sithu Kyaw
Heavy Phyo as Ye Lin

References

Burmese television series
MRTV (TV network) original programming